is a Japanese voice actor, television and theatrical actor, radio announcer and gospel singer. He is an active member of the theatrical group, Lilly Boat Army 2 and the Cube Group talent agency. He is best known for his roles as Geese Howard from the Fatal Fury series and Genjuro Kibagami from the Samurai Shodown series.

Roles

Anime
Samurai Spirits 2: Asura-Zanmaden (1999) - Genjuro Kibagami
Samurai 7 (2004) – Kikuchiyo
Ginga Legend Weed (2006) – Kaibutsu
Appleseed Ex Machina (2007) – Aeacus
Akaneiro ni Somaru Saka (2008) - Nagase (Father)
The King of Fighters: Destiny (2017) – Geese Howard

Video games
Samurai Shodown II (1994) – Genjuro Kibagami, Neinhalt Sieger
Fatal Fury 3: Road to the Final Victory (1995) – Geese Howard
Samurai Shodown III (1995) – Genjuro Kibagami
Real Bout Fatal Fury (1995) – Duck King, Geese Howard
The King of Fighters '96 (1996) – Geese Howard
Samurai Shodown IV (1996) – Genjuro Kibagami
Real Bout Fatal Fury Special (1997) – Duck King, Geese Howard
Samurai Shodown 64 (1997) – Genjuro Kibagami
Real Bout Fatal Fury 2: The Newcomers (1998) – Duck King, Geese Howard
Fatal Fury: Wild Ambition (1999) – Duck King, Geese Howard
Capcom vs. SNK: Millennium Fight 2000 (2000) – Geese Howard
Capcom vs. SNK 2: Millionaire Fighting 2001 (2001) – Geese Howard
SNK vs. Capcom: SVC Chaos (2003) – Geese Howard, Genjuro Kibagami
Samurai Shodown V (2003) – Genjuro Kibagami
Samurai Shodown VI (2004) – Genjuro Kibagami, Neinhalt Seiger
The King of Fighters Neowave (2005) – Geese Howard
NeoGeo Battle Coliseum (2005) – Geese Howard, Genjuro Kibagami
The King of Fighters XI (2005) – Duck King, Geese Howard
The King of Fighters: Maximum Impact 2 (2006) – Geese Howard, Richard Meyer
The King of Fighters '98: Ultimate Match (2008) – Geese Howard
The King of Fighters 2002: Unlimited Match (2009) – Geese Howard
The King of Fighters XIV (2016) – Geese Howard
Tekken 7 (2017) – Geese Howard (special moves and grunts)
Granblue Fantasy (2018) – Genjuro Kibagami
The King of Fighters All Star (2018–19) – Geese Howard, Genjuro Kibagami
Samurai Shodown (2019) – Genjuro Kibagami
The King of Fighters XV (2022) – Geese Howard

References

External links
Ricomotion Kong's official website
 

1961 births
Japanese male television actors
Japanese male voice actors
Japanese male video game actors
Living people
People from Sakai, Osaka
Male voice actors from Osaka Prefecture
Musicians from Osaka Prefecture
20th-century Japanese male actors
21st-century Japanese male actors
20th-century Japanese male singers
20th-century Japanese singers
21st-century Japanese male singers
21st-century Japanese singers